Stob Glacier is the 16 km long and 13 km wide glacier on Oscar II Coast, Graham Land in Antarctica situated southwest of Chuchuliga Glacier, east-southeast of Somers Glacier and south-southeast of Talbot Glacier.  It is draining from the slopes of Bruce Plateau north of Bersin Ridge, and flowing eastwards to join Crane Glacier.

The feature is named after the settlement of Stob in western Bulgaria.

Location
British mapping in 1976.

Maps
 Antarctic Digital Database (ADD). Scale 1:250000 topographic map of Antarctica. Scientific Committee on Antarctic Research (SCAR). Since 1993, regularly upgraded and updated.

References
 Stob Glacier. SCAR Composite Antarctic Gazetteer.
 Bulgarian Antarctic Gazetteer. Antarctic Place-names Commission. (details in Bulgarian, basic data in English)

External links 

 Stob Glacier
 Stob Glacier. Copernix satellite image

Glaciers of Oscar II Coast
Bulgaria and the Antarctic